A. M. Harun-ar-Rashid (1 May 1933 – 9 October 2021) was a Bangladeshi physicist and Professor of Physics at the University of Dhaka. He was the nephew of actor-writer Shamsuddin Abul Kalam.

Early life and education
Rashid was born in a village of Barisal district. His father Moksud Ali was the first person to have received postgraduate education in science. Rashid earned his BSc and MSc in physics from University of Dhaka in 1953 and 1954 respectively. He then completed his PhD from University of Glasgow in theoretical physics in 1960.

Career
Rashid joined the University of Dhaka as a lecturer of the Department of Physics. He became a full professor in 1972. He was the founder and chairman of the Department of Theoretical Physics in the University of Dhaka in 1975. He became chairman of the department in 1979. In 1993, he was named Bose Professor of Physics. He served as a Professor of Theoretical Physics and director of Institute of Physics, University of Islamabad from 1967 to 1971.

He served as the Director of Computer Center (now the Institute of Information Technology, University of Dhaka) in the University of Dhaka.

He was a visiting professor at the Institute für Theoretische Kernphysik, International Center for Theoretical Physics, Imperial College London, University of Texas, Austin and University of California, Los Angeles.

He was a senior scientific officer and principal scientific officer, Bangladesh Atomic Energy Commission from 1962 to 1967. He served as the vice president of Asiatic Society of Bangladesh from 1992 to 1993.

Honors and awards
 Ekushey Padak (1991)
 Independence Day Award (1999)
 Raja Kalinarayan Scholarship awarded by the University of Dhaka
 Best Science Writer Award by the Government of Bangladesh (2005)
 Star Lifetime Award on Physics (2016)

References

1933 births
2021 deaths
People from Barisal
Bangladeshi male writers
University of Dhaka alumni
Academic staff of the University of Dhaka
Bangladeshi physicists
Recipients of the Ekushey Padak
Recipients of the Independence Day Award
Fellows of Bangladesh Academy of Sciences